Dipterocarpus zeylanicus, commonly known as හොර - Hora in Sinhalese and සරල - Sarala or කිරිපලු - Kiripalu, is a species of Dipterocarpus that is endemic to Sri Lanka. A closely related Indian
species is Dipterocarpus turbinatus. The Sri Lankan tree is a large tree that grows up to 40 – 45 m tall and 4 – 6 m in circumference. The bark is light pinkish brown or light yellowish brown. Leaves are big and oval, 5 to 8 inches long. The sharp-edged leaves are covered with silver hairy. Flowers bloom in April and seeds have two wings to spread from wind. The bark contains considerable amounts of gray caller oleo resin. D. zeylanicus can be found in moist low country like Ratnapura, Kaluthara, Galle and Mathara districts and also in the Sinharaja rain forest.
The tallest (nearly 60m) trees of Hora in Sri Lanka are found in Udakiruwa village in Lunugala and under great threat of legal/illegal felling. There are many place names which begin with the name of the Hora tree. Even Tamil place names like Norochcholai (where a controversial coal power plant in Sri Lanka is located) is said to refer to a clump of Hora trees - i.e., "Horagolla" in Sinhalese.

It is used as a strong and hard wood and a weight of 54 lbs per cubic foot. The heartwood is light pinkish to dark reddish brown. After a preservative treatment, it is used for railway sleepers, rafters, electric posts, beams, joists, heavy types of carpentry work, and eminently suitable for underwater work.

In Theravada Buddhism, the tree is said to have played the role of the Bodhi tree for a Buddha of a previous epoch, viz., the thirteenth Buddha known as "Padumuththara - පදුමුත්තර".

References

"Sundara Sinharajaya" - Gamini Kumara Withana
Wood & it uses - Forest department of Sri Lanka 1962.

zeylanicus